Karel Navrátil (24 April 1867 – 23 December 1936) was a Czech violinist, composer and music educator. He was born in Prague, and studied in Vienna under Guido Adler and František Ondříček, afterward working as a composer and music teacher in Prague. Notable students include composers Helen Hopekirk, Arthur Hinton and John Powell.  He died in Prague.

Some sources have confused him with Karl Nawratil (1836-1914), attributing to him a substantial output of chamber music actually composed by the latter.

Selected works
Navrátil's compositions include opera, symphonies and symphonic poems, piano and violin concertos, chamber music and piano pieces, songs and choral works.
Opera
 Heřman, Op. 21
 Herman a Dorothea
 Salambo

Orchestral
 Symphony in G minor, Op. 4 [sic] (manuscript score dated 1902)
 Koncertní ouvertura (Concert Overture), Op. 5 (1872)
 Jan Hus, Symphonic Poem
 Žižka, Symphonic Poem
 Bílá hora (White Mountain; Blanche montagne), Symphonic Poem
 Indianerlegende for string orchestra with harp

Concertante
 Piano Concerto in F minor
 Violin Concerto in E major

Piano
 Variace na norské lidové písně (Variations on a Norwegian Folk Song; Variationen über ein norwegisches Volkslied), Op. 4 (1865)
 2 Skladby (2 Pieces), Op. 6 (1873)
 3 Balady (3 Ballades), Op. 14 (1883)
 3 Skladby (3 Pieces), Op. 19 (1888)

Choral
 Mše D-dur (Mass in D major) for soloists, chorus, orchestra and organ, Op. 26
 Kantor Halfar for male chorus

Vocal
 5 Lieder for voice and piano, Op. 10 (1881)
 3 Balladen for low voice and piano, Op. 13 (1883); words by Ludwig Uhland

References

External links
 

1867 births
1936 deaths
19th-century classical composers
19th-century Czech male musicians
20th-century classical composers
20th-century Czech male musicians
Czech classical composers
Czech male classical composers
Czech music educators
Czech opera composers
Czech Romantic composers
Male opera composers
Musicians from Prague